Ganehar is a town of Bahawalpur District in the Punjab province of eastern Pakistan. Neighbouring settlements included Faqirwali and Basti Babbar.

References

Populated places in Bahawalpur District